Parabraxas is a genus of moths in the family Epicopeiidae.

Species
 Parabraxas davidi (Oberthür, 1885)
 Parabraxas flavomarginaria (Leech, 1897)
 Parabraxas nigromacularia (Leech, 1897)

Former species
 Parabraxas erebina (Oberthür, 1896)

References

Epicopeiidae
Moth genera